Esperanto Youth Week (JES) is one of the most important Esperanto youth meetings in the world. It is organised by the German Esperanto Youth (GEJ) and the Polish Esperanto Youth (PEJ) at the end of every year in a different city of central Europe, starting 2009-10.

The meeting is taking the place of the former Internacia Seminario and Ago-Semajno, two Esperanto gatherings aimed at youth which had been overlapping since the beginning of the 2000s (decade); the former was organized by GEJ alone, while the latter was organized by the Polish Esperanto Youth and Varsovia Vento.

List of weeks

External links 
 Official website of the Esperanto Youth Week

References 

Esperanto meetings